Inagua is the southernmost district of the Bahamas, comprising the islands of Great Inagua and Little Inagua. The headquarters for the district council are in Matthew Town.

History
The original settlers were the Lucayan people, who arrived sometime between 500 and 800 CE, crossing in dugout canoes from Hispaniola and/or Cuba to the Bahamas. 

The name Heneagua was derived from a Spanish expression meaning 'water is to be found there'. Two names of apparent Lucayan origin, Inagua (meaning "Small Eastern Island") and Baneque (meaning "Big Water Island"), were used by the Spanish to refer to Great Inagua.

Between the years of 1500 and 1825, many documented treasure laden ships were destroyed on Inaguan reefs. The two most valuable wrecks lost off the Inaguas were treasure-laden Spanish galleons: the Santa Rosa in 1599; and the Infanta in 1788. Other ships of considerable value that were wrecked there include the French Le Count De Paix in 1713, the British HMS Lowestoffe in 1801, and the British HMS Statira in 1815.

As early as the 1600s, salt was being produced and shipped to Spanish colonies, and its extraction was a going business by 1803.

Henri Christophe, king of northern Haiti from 1811 to 1820, built a summer retreat at the Northeast Point of Great Inagua. Local legend has it that he also buried a cache of gold there.

By 1918, after the end of World War I, lower salt prices and competition had driven the small producers on Great Inagua out of business, and the salt works were abandoned except for incidental local use.

In 1935, the Erickson brothers from Massachusetts founded West India Chemicals Ltd., purchasing the abandoned salt works from the British government. They drilled test holes, set up offices, and began restoration of the buildings, but the locals felt threatened, fearing changes to the power structure status quo. In August 1937, a riot broke out, an employee was killed, and the Ericksons were forced to flee. They soon returned, and full-scale development resumed.

In the mid-1950s, Morton Salt bought the Great Inagua saltworks, which includes over 80 salt ponds, now the second largest such operation in North America. Morton is the major employer on the island.

Islands

Great Inagua
The population of Great Inagua is 913 (2010 census).

The island's capital and only harbour is Matthew Town, named after George Matthew, a 19th-century Governor of the Bahamas. This town houses the Morton Salt Company’s main facility, producing one million tonnes of sea salt a year — the second largest solar saline operation in North America and Inagua's main industry.

Great Inagua Airport (IATA: IGA, ICAO: MYIG) is located nearby.

A large bird sanctuary in the centre of the island has a population of more than 80,000 West Indian flamingoes and many other bird species, including the Bahama parrot, Inagua woodstar, Bahama pintail, brown pelican, tricolored heron, snowy egret, reddish egret, stripe-headed tanager, double-crested cormorant, Neotropic cormorant, roseate spoonbill, American kestrel, and burrowing owl. The Union Creek National Reserve is specially set aside for the study of green sea turtles (Chelonia mydas).

Little Inagua
The neighbouring Little Inagua,  to the northeast, is uninhabited and occupied by a large Land and Sea Park. Various species of endangered sea turtles breed on the island.

Gallery

Notes

Further reading
 
  Also published under the title: Inagua: Which is the Name of a Very Lonely and Nearly Forgotten Island. (Natural History of the island)

External links
 Great Inagua Photos, January 2006
 The Nassau Guardian

 
Islands of the Bahamas
Districts of the Bahamas